Inspector is a police rank.

Inspector or The Inspector may also refer to:

 Inspector, a person working in the field of inspection

Arts, entertainment, and media

Cartoons
The Inspector, a cartoon series based on the Inspector Clouseau character from the Pink Panther films
"The Inspector", an episode of the cartoon She-Ra: Princess of Power

Films
Inspector (1953 film), a 1953 Indian Tamil language film
Inspector (1956 film), a Bollywood suspense thriller film, directed by Shakti Samanta
The Inspector (1962 film), a drama starring Stephen Boyd and Dolores Hart
Inspector (1968 film), an Indian Malayalam film 
Inspector (1970 film), a Bollywood action thriller film

Other uses in arts, entertainment, and media
Inspector (band), a Mexican music band, which fuses ska and reggae with Mexican rhythms
The Inspector, a 1973 collection of drawings by The New Yorker cartoonist Saul Steinberg

Other uses
Inspector (role variant), a personality type in the Keirsey Temperament Sorter
Chalcostephia flavifrons, or Inspector, a species of dragonfly
People who perform building inspections
People who perform home inspections

See also
 Inspector Clouseau, a character from the Pink Panther films
Inspector Gadget, a media franchise that began in 1983
Inspector general, an investigative official
Inspector window, a type of computing window
Inspectorate, a body charged with reporting on some institution in its field of competence
 "The Safety Inspector", a Swift and Shift Couriers episode